Anna Margaret Smedvig (born October 1983) is a Norwegian-born businesswoman, multi-millionaire and chairman of Smedvig Capital based in the United Kingdom.

Smedvig is also the executive chairman of the Smedvig group of companies, which includes Smedvig Property and the Smedvig Family Office.

A resident in the UK since the early 1990s, she and her father Peter Smedvig are estimated to be worth £847 million by the Sunday Times Rich List. She is one of Norway's richest women.

Early life 
Smedvig is the only child of Esther Smedvig and Peter Smedvig. In 1996, her father founded Smedvig Capital where she now serves as chairman.

She is also the granddaughter of Torolf Smedvig and great-granddaughter of Peder Smedvig. In 1915, Peder Smedvig founded Smedvig ASA, an offshore oil rig company.

Her grandmother was Nora Kluge, who was the daughter of Norwegian supreme court judge Kristofer Nordahl Kluge. In the early 1990s, she moved to London with her parents.

Smedvig studied at the University of Edinburgh and graduated with an MA in Psychology and Business.

Career

Smedvig Capital 
Smedvig currently serves as the Chairman of Smedvig Capital, which is a London-based investment firm. She took up the position in 2016. Founded in 1996, Smedvig Capital has invested over £1 billion in British and Nordic firms.

Anna Margaret is also the Executive Chairman of the Smedvig group of companies, which includes Smedvig Property and the Smedvig Family Office.

Other 
Smedvig previously worked for L Catterton, Smythson and EC Hambro Rabben.

Personal life 
Smedvig lives in London with her husband, but remains a Norwegian citizen.

She is interested in fashion, film, architecture and design.

References 

1983 births
Living people
Norwegian billionaires
Norwegian businesspeople
Norwegian expatriates in the United Kingdom
Smedvig family